The Pinnacle Playhouse is a theatre in Belleville, Ontario, Canada. It houses the Belleville Theatre Guild, a member of the Eastern Ontario Drama League.

History
In 1951, a group of friends gathered to read a play for pleasure. They enjoyed it so much they decided they would form a group and perform it. That fall, they met again at a tea room in downtown Belleville to plan a public meeting in the Corby Library for forming a theatre guild in Belleville.

"The Voice of the People", a play by Robertson Davies, was one of the first one act plays performed. It went on to win the Eastern Ontario Drama League Festival and was invited to the Dominion Drama Festival in Saint John, New Brunswick, the next spring.

With the onset of television, the theatre struggled to stay alive with little money or location to operate from. Places were used that ranged from the third storey of a downtown building, to a donated room at the back of a building, to a vacant storefront. In 1969, the city of Belleville provided the guild with use of the D.L. Storey Building on Pinnacle Street, which was formerly a Salvation Army Citadel. The guild members were responsible for all operating costs of the building, including utilities, heat, repairs and maintenance, plus any renovations that are required. It was then renamed the Pinnacle Playhouse and it has been the source of its success ever since.

By the time the theatre celebrated its 50th anniversary in 2001, it had established itself as Belleville's primary (and at times only) hub for live theatre with early members including Jim Alexander, Liz Marshall and Steve Forrester still spearheading consistent high quality in its productions.

Today the Belleville Theatre Guild, at Pinnacle Playhouse, puts on five shows annually. Each season culminates with a musical. In addition to their regular season they are a venue for the Belleville Doc Fest, Night Kitchen Too (a musical variety performance), and occasional screenings of silent films. Marianne Ackerman has held public readings of her in-progress works at the venue. Beginning in 2014, BTG began hosting local playwrights with an annual off-season show called the Evening of One-Acts. Playwrights whose short works have debuted here include Peter Paylor, Judie Preece, Maurice Leslie, Wayne Clark, Ian Feltham, Keith Taylor and Adri Boodoosingh.

Renovations
The Playhouse has undergone many transformations, including the initial upgrade to a 126-seat theatre with a revolving stage (which was removed in later renovations). In 1982 – 83 the Belleville Theatre Guild, with donations from subscribers, community groups and local and provincial governments, renovated the Playhouse to increase seating to 154 and to provide essential space both onstage and off.

In 2002, the Belleville Theatre Guild initiated its "Help Give Us A Lift" campaign to raise funds for an elevator addition, additional wing space, a new box office and a barrier-free washroom. A grant was given by the Ontario Trillium Foundation. The Guild's building fund, which had been saved for many years, provided the majority of remaining costs. The balance was raised through donations from businesses and individuals in the community. The most significant of these sponsors have their names engraved in the BTG Walk of Fame (on the sidewalk outside the theatre).

Mission
The Belleville Theatre Guild provides quality community theatre to Hastings County. It has presented a wide variety of plays, musicals and theatre-related workshops. For three generations, the guild has brought theatre training through outreach programmes, and opportunities to perform to young people and those young at heart.

Annex
The Guild also has a warehouse space called the Annex, which houses set pieces, props, costumes, a board room, a workroom for set builders and a rehearsal space for upcoming productions.

References

External links
Belleville Theatre Guild

Theatres in Ontario
Belleville, Ontario
Buildings and structures in Hastings County
Former Salvation Army citadels